In the United States, an interstate compact is a pact or agreement between two or more states, or between states and any foreign government. The Compact Clause (Article I, Section 10, Clause 3) of the United States Constitution provides that "No State shall, without the Consent of Congress,... enter into any Agreement or Compact with another State, or with a foreign Power,..."

However, in a report released in October 2019 about the proposed National Popular Vote Interstate Compact, the Congressional Research Service (CRS) cited the U.S. Supreme Court's ruling in Virginia v. Tennessee (1893)—reaffirmed in U.S. Steel Corp. v. Multistate Tax Commission (1978) and Cuyler v. Adams (1981)—that ruled that explicit congressional consent of interstate compacts is not required for agreements "which the United States can have no possible objection or have any interest in interfering with" (in addition to ruling that the words "agreement" and "compact" used in the Compact Clause are synonyms). Instead, the Court required explicit congressional consent for interstate compacts that are "directed to the formation of any combination tending to the increase of political power in the States, which may encroach upon or interfere with the just supremacy of the United States"—meaning where the vertical balance of power between the federal government and state governments is altered in favor of state governments, while the report references U.S. Steel Corp. v. Multistate Tax Commission as stating that the "pertinent inquiry [with respect to the Compact Clause] is one of potential, rather than actual, impact on federal supremacy" in noting that the potential erosion of an enumerated power of the United States Congress by an interstate compact can arguably require explicit congressional approval. The CRS report cites the Supreme Court's rulings in Florida v. Georgia (1855) and in Texas v. New Mexico and Colorado (2018) as recognizing that explicit congressional consent is also required for interstate compacts that alter the horizontal balance of power amongst state governments.

Citing Metropolitan Washington Airports Authority v. Citizens for Abatement of Aircraft Noise, Inc. (1991) as stating that if an enumerated power under the Constitution is legislative, then "Congress must exercise it in conformity with the bicameralism and presentment requirements of Article I, Section VII", and noting that the Republican River Compact was initially vetoed by President Franklin D. Roosevelt in 1942, the CRS report states that if an interstate compact requires explicit congressional approval, it must be approved by both houses of Congress and signed into law by the President in order to become law. In Cuyler v. Adams, the Court held that congressional approval of interstate compacts, implicitly or explicitly, makes them federal laws. The CRS report cites the Court's opinions in Virginia v. Tennessee and Northeast Bancorp v. Federal Reserve Board of Governors (1985) as stating that any agreement between two or more states that "cover[s] all stipulations affecting the conduct or claims of the parties", prohibits members from "modify[ing] or repeal[ing] [the agreement] unilaterally", and requires "'reciprocation' of mutual obligations" constitutes an interstate compact. Additionally, the CRS report cites the Court's opinion in Northeast Bancorp as suggesting that a requirement of a new interstate governmental entity is a sufficient condition for an agreement to qualify as being an interstate compact under the Compact Clause. The CRS report stated that there were approximately 200 interstate compacts in effect in 2019.

The timing for Congressional consent is not specified by the Constitution, so consent may be given either before or after the states have agreed to a particular compact. The consent may be explicit, but it may also be inferred from circumstances. Congress may also impose conditions as part of its approval of a compact. Congress must explicitly approve any compact that would give a state power that is otherwise designated to the federal government.

Most early interstate compacts resolved boundary disputes, but since the early 20th century, compacts have increasingly been used as a tool of state cooperation. In some cases, an agreement will create a new multi-state governmental agency which is responsible for administering or improving some shared resource such as a seaport or public transportation infrastructure.

Interstate compacts are distinct from Uniform Acts, which are model statutes produced by non-governmental bodies of legal experts to be passed by state legislatures independently, rather than constituting an agreement among multiple states.

History
Treaties between the states, ratified under the Articles of Confederation during the period after American independence in 1776 until the current U.S. Constitution was ratified in 1789, are grandfathered and treated as interstate compacts.  This includes agreements like the Treaty of Beaufort, which set the boundary between Georgia and South Carolina in 1787, and is still in effect.

Prior to 1922, most interstate compacts were either border agreements between states or advisory compacts, the latter of which are tasked with conducting joint studies to report back to the respective state legislatures. With the creation of the Port Authority of New York and New Jersey in 1922, administrative compacts began to develop as a third, more-empowered type of interstate compact, in which persistent governance structures are tasked by member states with conducting designated services.

Today, Virginia is a member of the most interstate compacts at 40, while Hawaii is a member of the fewest at 15.

Operating agencies created by interstate compact

Borders and land/water administration
Atlantic States Marine Fisheries Commission (Maine, New Hampshire, Massachusetts, Rhode Island, Connecticut, New York, New Jersey, Pennsylvania, Delaware, Maryland, Virginia, North Carolina, South Carolina, Georgia, and Florida)
Bear River Commission (Idaho, Utah and Wyoming)
Breaks Interstate Park Commission (Kentucky and Virginia)
Colorado River Compact (Colorado, New Mexico, Utah, Wyoming, Nevada, Arizona, and California)
Columbia River Gorge Commission (Oregon and Washington)
Connecticut River Valley Flood Control Commission (Connecticut, Massachusetts, New Hampshire, and Vermont)
Delaware River Basin Commission (Pennsylvania, Delaware, New Jersey, and New York)
Delaware River Port Authority (Pennsylvania and New Jersey)
Delaware River and Bay Authority (Delaware and New Jersey)
Great Lakes Commission (Illinois, Indiana, Michigan, Minnesota, New York, Ohio, Pennsylvania, and Wisconsin, plus Canadian provinces of Ontario and Quebec as associate members)
Gulf States Marine Fisheries Commission (Alabama, Florida, Louisiana, Mississippi, and Texas)
Interstate Commission on the Potomac River Basin (Maryland, West Virginia, Virginia, Pennsylvania, and District of Columbia)
Interstate Environmental Commission (Connecticut, New Jersey and New York) 
Interstate Oil and Gas Compact Commission
Interstate Wildlife Violator Compact (all states except Hawaii and Massachusetts)
NEIWPCC (originally called the New England Interstate Water Pollution Control Commission) (Connecticut, Maine, Massachusetts, New Hampshire, New York, Rhode Island, Vermont) 
Northwest Power and Conservation Council (Oregon, Washington, Montana, and Idaho)
Pacific States Marine Fisheries Commission (California, Oregon, Washington, Idaho, and Alaska)
Palisades Interstate Park Commission (New York and New Jersey)
Port Authority of New York and New Jersey (New Jersey and New York)
Red River Compact Commission (Arkansas, Louisiana, Oklahoma and Texas)
Susquehanna River Basin Commission (Pennsylvania, New York, and Maryland)
Tahoe Regional Planning Agency (California and Nevada)
Waterfront Commission of New York Harbor (New Jersey and New York)

Transportation
Bi-State Development Agency (Missouri and Illinois)
Washington Metropolitan Area Transit Authority (Maryland, Virginia, and Washington, D.C.)
Washington Metropolitan Area Transit Commission (Maryland, Virginia, and Washington, D.C.)
Kansas City Area Transportation Authority (Kansas and Missouri)
Midwest Interstate Passenger Rail Commission (Illinois, Indiana, Kansas, Michigan, Minnesota, Missouri, Nebraska, North Dakota, Wisconsin)
Virginia-North Carolina High Speed Rail Compact (North Carolina and Virginia)
Delaware River Joint Toll Bridge Commission (Pennsylvania and New Jersey)

Other
Interstate Compact on the Placement of Children (all 50 states)
Western States Pact (California, Colorado, Nevada, Oregon, Washington) 
Rivendell Interstate School District (New Hampshire, Vermont)
Interstate Commission for Adult Offender Supervision (all states, two territories, and Washington, D.C.) 
Regional Greenhouse Gas Initiative (Connecticut, Delaware, Maine, Maryland, Massachusetts, New Hampshire, New Jersey, New York, Rhode Island, Vermont, and Virginia)
Dresden School District (New Hampshire, Vermont)
Driver License Compact (all states except Georgia, Massachusetts, Tennessee, and Wisconsin)
Eastern States Multi-state Council (New York, New Jersey, Pennsylvania, Massachusetts, Rhode Island, Connecticut, Delaware)
Education Commission of the States (all states [except Washington State]; three territories; and Washington, D.C.)
Electronic Registration Information Center (32 states and Washington, D.C.)
Emergency Management Assistance Compact (all states, plus Washington, D.C., Puerto Rico, and the U.S. Virgin Islands)
Multistate Tax Commission (all states except Delaware, Nevada, and Virginia)
Nurse Licensure Compact (33 states)
Recognition of EMS Personnel Licensure Interstate CompAct
Midwest Governors Regional Pact (Illinois, Indiana, Kentucky, Michigan, Minnesota, Ohio, Wisconsin)

Non-operating interstate compacts 
National Popular Vote Interstate Compact, which will not take effect until additional states join the compact to send all their electors to the electoral college based on the results of the popular vote
Northeast Interstate Dairy Compact, cancelled in 2001 by an act of Congress
Transportation Climate Initiative, a proposed compact among the same states as the Regional Greenhouse Gas Initiative

See also 

 American Association of State Highway and Transportation Officials, United States Numbered Highway System, and the United States Bicycle Route System
 Enhanced cooperation, a similar system in the European Union
 Occupational licensing, a more recent focus of newer interstate compacts
 Treaty, an agreement between two or more international actors (usually sovereign states)

References

Works cited 
 

Article One of the United States Constitution
United States interstate agencies